Lieutenant General Sir Brian Charles Hannam Kimmins   (30 July 1899 – 15 November 1979) was a British military commander who served as the General Officer Commanding Northern Ireland District.

Military career
Kimmins was born in Hendon, Middlesex (now North London), the son of psychologist Charles William Kimmins and Dame Grace Kimmins. He was the older brother of Anthony Kimmins.

After attending and later graduating from the Royal Military Academy, Woolwich on 28 September 1917, Kimmins was commissioned as a second lieutenant into the Royal Field Artillery of the British Army, during the latter phases of World War I.

After the War he served in India and Egypt and became Aide-de-Camp to the High Commissioner for Egypt and the Sudan in 1928. He became adjutant at the Royal Military Academy, Woolwich in 1930 and brigade major for the 49th (West Riding) Infantry Division's 147th Infantry Brigade in 1935. He then attended the Staff College, Camberley from 1938 to 1939.

He served in World War II initially as a General Staff Officer with the British Expeditionary Force in France before becoming an instructor at the Staff College in 1940. He was appointed Deputy Director of Military Training at the War Office in 1941 and became a Brigadier on the General Staff of Southern Command in 1942. He became Commander Royal Artillery for the Guards Armoured Division in 1943 and Director of Plans for South East Asia Command in 1944. He was finally Assistant Chief of Staff at the Headquarters of the Supreme Allied Commander South East Asia in 1945. On 24 February 1945 he was promoted to the rank of major-general.

After the Second World War he became Chief of Staff at Headquarters Combined Operations in 1946 and Director of Quartering at the War Office in 1947. He was appointed General Officer Commanding Home Counties District and GOC 44th (Home Counties) Infantry Division in 1950 and Director of the Territorial Army and Cadets in 1952. His last appointment was as General Officer Commanding Northern Ireland District in 1955.

Kimmins retired in 1958. He died at the Somerset Nuffield Hospital in Taunton on 15 November 1979, leaving a wife and three children.

Bibliography
At Your Service - a belated autobiography of Lieutenant General Sir Brian Kimmins KBE CB DL, Foreword by Field Marshal Lord Guthrie GCB LVO OBE DL''

References

External links
Generals of World War II

|-

1899 births
1979 deaths
Royal Field Artillery officers
British Army lieutenant generals
Knights Commander of the Order of the British Empire
Companions of the Order of the Bath
Royal Artillery officers
People from Hendon
Military personnel from Middlesex
British Army personnel of World War I
British Army generals of World War II
Academics of the Staff College, Camberley
War Office personnel in World War II
Academics of the Royal Military Academy, Woolwich
Graduates of the Royal Military Academy, Woolwich
Graduates of the Staff College, Camberley